Rajeshwar (Reg) Sharma (born 27 June 1962) is a former Kenyan cricketer who played first-class cricket for Derbyshire between 1985 and 1989.

Sharma first played for the second XI of Kent, until 1983. He was drafted in as an emergency measure for a game with Gloucestershire later in the same year, when they were short of an opening strike partner for eventual centurion John Skinner, but played only one game for the team.

Sharma's first-class career, which lasted four years, started with a debut for Derbyshire at Nottinghamshire in 1985. Sharma maintained a strong middle-order position in the batting lineup for the next four years, hitting a first-class best, and his only century innings, of 111 in 1987.

Sharma continued in first-class cricket until 1989. He was a right-handed batsman, right-arm offbreak bowler and wicket-keeper.

References

1962 births
Living people
Kenyan cricketers
Derbyshire cricketers
Kenyan people of Indian descent